Country Party was the original 17th Century name of what developed into the British Whig Party. In later times, the name reappeared in various political contexts in English-speaking countries, including:

 In Australia:
 Australian Country Party (2004), formerly the Australian Country Alliance in Victoria
 Country Party of Australia, now called the National Party of Australia
 In Great Britain:
 Country Party (Britain), opponents of the Court Party and the government, late 17th and early 18th century
 Ultra-Tories, active 1829–32
 Country Party (New Zealand), active in the 1920s and 1930s
 PNG Country Party, Papua New Guinea
 Country Party (Rhode Island), active in the 1780s
 Wyoming Country Party, formed in 2012
 "Country Party" (song), a song by Johnny Lee

See also
 Countryside Party (UK)
 New Country Party, Australia
 United Country Party (disambiguation)
 County Party